The 2007 World Short Track Speed Skating Team Championships was the 17th edition of the World Short Track Speed Skating Team Championships, which took place on 17–18 March 2007 in Budapest, Hungary.

Teams were divided into two brackets of four: the best team from each bracket qualified directly for the Final A, while the two next teams entered the repechage round and the last was eliminated for the Final B. The best two teams in the repechage round qualified for the Final B, while the last two entered the Final B. Each team was represented by four athletes at both 500 m and 1000 m as well as by two athletes at 3000 m. There were four heats at both 500 m and 1000 m, whereby each heat consisted of athletes representing different countries. There was one heat at 3000 m.

Medal winners

Results

Men

Women

References

External links
 2007 World Short Track Speed Skating Team Championships results
 Results in ISU's database
 Result book

World Short Track Speed Skating Team Championships
2007 World Short Track Speed Skating Team Championships